Frank Archer may refer to:

 Frank B. Archer (1858–1914), American politician in Ohio
 Frank Archer (politician) (1846–1902), Tasmanian politician
 Frank Archer (Fullmetal Alchemist), a character in Fullmetal Alchemist

See also
 Francis Archer (1803–1875), Irish physician and naturalist